Guillermo Álvarez, full name Guillermo Álvarez Perdomo (born July 14, 1986), was a Venezuelan footballer. The last team he played was C.A. Rentistas in the Uruguayan First Division.

References

1986 births
Living people
Footballers from Caracas
Venezuelan footballers
Club Atlético River Plate (Montevideo) players
Rampla Juniors players
C.A. Rentistas players
Venezuelan expatriate footballers
Expatriate footballers in Uruguay
Association football fullbacks
Venezuelan expatriate sportspeople in Uruguay